Chairo Christian School is a multi-campus co-educational independent non-denominational Christian School with campuses in Drouin, Victoria, Drouin East, Pakenham, Victoria, Leongatha, Victoria, and Traralgon, Victoria.

Founded in 1983, Chairo currently caters for over 1,700 students from Prep to Year 12 all across Gippsland, with the largest campus being at Pakenham. Chairo Christian School also has a Kindergarten program that caters for children aged 3-4.

According to a statement from its principal, the school teaches both evolution and creationism, though clearly states the school's belief in creationism in such classes.

History 
Chairo was founded in 1983 with 19 students and one teacher on the Drouin East Campus, which was the old Drouin East Primary School. This original school building has since been retired, being relocated at Mill Valley Ranch in Tynong, Victoria in 1999. There are now more than 1,600 students within the campuses. The name "Chairo" comes from the Greek "χαιρω", meaning "Rejoice".

The school's Pakenham Campus began its VCE classes in 2008 and its music curriculum in 2009 with its first production of Seussical the Musical, Peter Pan in 2010 and Barnum in 2011.

Affiliations 
Chairo Christian School is affiliated with Independent Schools Victoria (ISV), Christian Education National (CEN) and the Australian Association of Christian Schools (AACC)

Chairo is also part of a variety of Inter-School networks that compete regularly with Sporting and Cultural events. School Sports Victoria (SSV) network, Christian Schools Events Network (CSEN), and the Gippsland Independent Schools Association (GIS), originally competing in Sports and Cultural competitions, now solely Cultural and leadership events and occasions.

Campuses 
Chairo Christian School features five campuses. Originally starting with their Drouin East Campus in 1983 then expanding to a Senior Campus in Drouin. In 1998, Chairo expanded into the Pakenham area facilitating a large expansion becoming the largest campus. In 2014 the School took management of a new Leongatha Campus originally starting in 1978 called South Coast Christian College. In 2018, the Traralgon Campus originally a campus of Flinders Christian Community College, becoming the latest member of the Chairo family.

 Drouin Campus - Drouin (Years 5-12)
 Drouin East Campus (Kindergarten-Year 4)
 Pakenham Campus (Kindergarten-Year 12)
 Leongatha Campus (Kindergarten-Year 10)
 Traralgon Campus (Kindergarten -Year 8)

House system 
In 1995, the house system was originally introduced to the Drouin Senior Campus initially with under twenty students in each House. The Drouin Houses were named after iconic Christian Missionaries which included Aylward House (blue), named after Gladys Aylward. Elliot House (red), named after Jim Elliot. Flynn House (green), named after John Flynn and Liddell House (yellow), named after Eric Liddell. After the introduction of a third campus in Pakenham, a new house system was introduced named after founding families of the school. This included Ballantyne (blue), Hughes (yellow), Knowles (red) and Noordermeer (green). In the Leongatha campus, three Houses were established in 2014 with three Houses named Banksia (red), Bluegum (blue) and Wattle (yellow), named after fauna found in Australia.

During House events such as Athletics and Swimming at the Drouin Campus, the Leongatha (orange) and Traralgon (purple) Campus participate as two additional Houses, regardless of their respected Houses interior to the campuses.

Curriculum 
Chairo offers its Years 11 and 12 students the Victorian Certificate of Education (VCE), the main assessment program which ranks the students in the state, as well as the Victorian Certificate of Applied Learning (VCAL).

Co-curriculum

Sport 
Hockey

Chairo has a strong history in Field Hockey. In 2022 the Senior Girls team won the State School Victoria (SSV) hockey championships. Their girls intermediate team also won it in 2019 and were runner up in 2018. In 2022 after playing for the Victorian State School team at the Australian Championships in Tasmania, Bianca Zurrer was named in the All Australian Team.

Netball 
Chairo Christian School won the Boys Division in the International Schools Netball Championships in 2011

Performing arts

Music 
Chairo Christian School offers at all its campuses a sophisticated and engaging music curriculum which includes a variety of music genres and styles from concert band, choir and worship bands. The Pakenham Campus' popular Music On The Lawn is special event held yearly on the lawn of the campus gardens which showcases the talent of students throughout all year levels.

The Drouin, Leongatha and Traralgon campuses compete against one another alongside other GIS schools at the annual 'MuseArtz' festival.

Theatre 
At Chairo Christian School, each senior campus has a strong theatrical presence in holding concerts and musical productions either yearly or biyearly, holding other theatrical events in between like the popular 'Out There' in Secondary at the Drouin Campus, or 'Cabaret' at the Leongatha Campus.

Notable Chairo productions include Fiddler on the Roof, Sound of Music, Beauty and the Beast and Oliver!, each held at the West Gippsland Arts Centre. With the recent building of a Cultural Centre, 'The Balfour', Chairo now has the capacity to hold musicals and productions all year round.

Notable alumni 

Emma Gunn ('13) Player for the Victorian Women's Premier League Soccer, Sandringham
Anthony Mcdonald-Tipungwuti ('12) AFL player for Essendon

References

Nondenominational Christian schools in Victoria (Australia)
Educational institutions established in 1983
1983 establishments in Australia
Gippsland (region)